Ease It is a jazz album credited to Rocky Boyd's Quintet, featuring Kenny Dorham on trumpet. It is the only known recording by the saxophonist, and was first released by Jazztime Records (JTL 001). It was also released by Muse Records as Ease It! (MR 5053). In 1989, Black Lion released an edition on CD titled West 42nd Street, credited to Kenny Dorham, which comprised all the takes from the session.

Reception

The contemporaneous DownBeat reviewer commented on a strong John Coltrane influence on Boyd, but stated that little was expressed emotionally, and concluded that, "On the whole, this is a depressing and disappointing date".

Track listing
Ease It (1961) (1974 Muse)
"Avars" (Boyd) – 7:42
"Stella by Starlight" (Young, Washington) – 5:05
"Why Not?" (LaRoca) – 7:26
"Ease It!" (Chambers) – 10:35
"Samba De Orfeu" (Luiz Bonfá) – 4:31
"West 42nd Street" (Hardin) – 4:23

West 42nd Street (1989)
"Avars" [Take 3] – 7:42
"Stella by Starlight" [Take 1] – 5:05
"Stella by Starlight" [Take 2] – 5:17
"Why Not?" [Take 1] – 7:26
"Why Not?" [Take 2] – 9:17
"Ease It!" [Take 1] – 10:35
"Samba De Orfeu" [Take 5] – 4:31
"Samba De Orfeu" [Take 6] – 4:29
"West 42nd Street" [Take 7] – 3:51
"West 42nd Street" [Take 8] – 4:23

Personnel
Kenny Dorham – trumpet
Rocky Boyd – tenor sax
Walter Bishop Jr. – piano
Ron Carter –  bass
Pete LaRoca – drums

References

1961 albums
Black Lion Records albums
Muse Records albums
Kenny Dorham albums